Conroy is an unincorporated community and census-designated place (CDP) in central Iowa County, Iowa, United States. It lies along local roads southeast of the city of Marengo, the county seat of Iowa County.  Its elevation is 879 feet (268 m). Conroy has a post office with the ZIP Code of 52220, which opened on 5 January 1885.  As of the 2010 census the population was 259.

Demographics

History
Conroy's population was 12 in 1902, and 100 in 1925.

See also
Plagmann Round Barn, listed on the National Register of Historic Places

References

Unincorporated communities in Iowa County, Iowa
Unincorporated communities in Iowa
1885 establishments in Iowa
Census-designated places in Iowa County, Iowa